Metolcarb (chemical formula: C9H11NO2) is a chemical compound used as an acaricide and an insecticide.

References

Acetylcholinesterase inhibitors
Carbamate insecticides
Acaricides
Phenol esters